Stanisław Komornicki (26 July 1924 – 10 April 2010) was a brigadier general in the Polish Army and the chancellor of the Order Virtuti Militari.
He was born in Warsaw. He was a Polish underground activist (pseudonym: Nałęcz), a member of underground Scouting (Szare Szeregi), a soldier of Armia Krajowa, a participant in the Warsaw Uprising, an officer of the Polish First Army, a participant in the Battle of Kolberg, a writer, and a military historian.

He was listed on the flight manifest of the Tupolev Tu-154 of the 36th Special Aviation Regiment carrying the President of Poland Lech Kaczyński which crashed near Smolensk-North airport near Pechersk near Smolensk, Russia, on 10 April 2010, killing all aboard.

Honours and awards
Silver Cross of the Order of Virtuti Militari
Grand Cross of the Order of Polonia Restituta (2005)
Cross of Grunwald, Third Class
Partisan Cross
Armia Krajowa Cross
Silver Medal for merit in the Field of Glory
Medal for participation in a defensive war in 1939
Warsaw Medal 1939–1945
Medal for Odra, Nysa, Baltic Sea
Medal of Victory and Freedom 1945
Award of the Minister of National Defence (1964, for a book on the barricades of Warsaw)

References

 

1924 births
2010 deaths
Polish generals
Polish male writers
Recipients of the Silver Cross of the Virtuti Militari
Grand Crosses of the Order of Polonia Restituta
Recipients of the Order of the Cross of Grunwald
Recipients of the Armia Krajowa Cross
Victims of the Smolensk air disaster
Home Army members
Writers from Warsaw
Warsaw Uprising insurgents